Farida Azizova (born 6 June 1995 in Qusar, Azerbaijan) is an Azerbaijani taekwondo practitioner.  She competed in the 67 kg event at the 2012 Summer Olympics and was eliminated by Karine Sergerie in the preliminary round. She also competed in the 67 kg event at the 2016 Summer Olympics but lost the Bronze medal match. She has qualified to the 2020 Summer Olympics through the 2021 European Taekwondo Olympic Qualification Tournament.

References

External links
 

1995 births
Living people
People from Qusar
Azerbaijani female taekwondo practitioners
Olympic taekwondo practitioners of Azerbaijan
Taekwondo practitioners at the 2012 Summer Olympics
Taekwondo practitioners at the 2015 European Games
European Games medalists in taekwondo
European Games silver medalists for Azerbaijan
Taekwondo practitioners at the 2016 Summer Olympics
European Taekwondo Championships medalists
World Taekwondo Championships medalists
Islamic Solidarity Games competitors for Azerbaijan
Islamic Solidarity Games medalists in taekwondo
Taekwondo practitioners at the 2020 Summer Olympics
21st-century Azerbaijani women